is a trans-Neptunian object and suspected member of the Haumea family, located in the Kuiper belt in the outermost region of the Solar System. It was discovered on 24 October 2003, by astronomers of the Spacewatch survey project at Kitt Peak Observatory, Arizona. The object may also be a non-resonant cubewano.

Orbit and physical characterization 

 orbits the Sun at a distance of 38.3–49.8 AU once every 292 years and 5 months (semi-major axis of 44.05 AU). Its orbit has an eccentricity of 0.13 and an inclination of 27° with respect to the ecliptic. Precovery images have been identified back to 2002.

Estimates for its diameter range between 138 and 423 kilometers. Two rotational lightcurves of the object gave a rotation period of 6 and 10.61 hours with a brightness amplitude of 0.1 and 0.09 in magnitude, respectively. It has a spectral type of BB, with a grey/blue rather than red color.

Origin

Based on their common pattern of infrared water-ice absorption and the clustering of their orbital elements, the other KBOs, it appear to be collisional fragments broken off the dwarf planet . The neutral color of the spectrum of these objects in the visible range evidences a lack of complex organics on the surface of these bodies that has been studied in detail for the surface of Haumea.

See also 
 List of Solar System objects most distant from the Sun

References

External links 
 Asteroid Lightcurve Database (LCDB), query form (info )
 Discovery Circumstances: Numbered Minor Planets (415001)-(420000) – Minor Planet Center
 

416400
416400
416400
416400
20031024